Harrison L. "Harry" Spence (February 22, 1856 – May 17, 1908) was a professional baseball player and manager. He managed the Indianapolis Hoosiers of the National League in 1888, leading the team to 50 wins, with 85 losses, in 136 games.

Spence also played and managed in minor league baseball. His playing career began in 1877, being interrupted in 1888 and resuming for one final season in 1889. In 1885, he served as player-manager of the Toronto club in the Canadian League. He returned to manage one final season in 1899 with the Portland Phenoms of the New England League before retiring.

See also
List of managers of defunct Major League Baseball teams

External links

Major League Baseball managers
Columbus Buckeyes (minor league) players
Lynn Live Oaks players
Worcester (minor league baseball) players
Springfield (minor league baseball) players
Trenton (minor league baseball) players
Saginaw Greys players
Baltimore Monumentals (minor league) players
Toronto (minor league baseball) players
Portland (minor league baseball) players
New Haven (minor league baseball) players
Minor league baseball managers
Baseball players from New York City
1856 births
1908 deaths